Beyt-e Mohareb (also Romanized as Beyt-e Moḩāreb and Beyt-e Maḩāreb; also known as Bait-i-Muhārib) is a village in Veys Rural District, Veys District, Bavi County, Khuzestan Province, Iran. At the 2006 census, its population was 1,215, in 172 families.

References 

Populated places in Bavi County